The Canadian Screen Award for Best TV Movie is a Canadian television award, presented by the Academy of Canadian Cinema and Television to honour the year's best Canadian television film. Originally presented as part of the Gemini Awards, since 2013 it has been presented as part of the Canadian Screen Awards.

From the inception of the Gemini Awards in 1986 until 1994, separate awards were presented for television films and miniseries; since 1995, they have usually been merged into a single Limited Series or Dramatic Program category covering both types of programs, but were sometimes split out into separate categories again in the latter half of the 2000s. As of the 8th Canadian Screen Awards in 2020, dramatic limited series are now eligible for the Canadian Screen Award for Best Dramatic Series instead of either having their own category or being merged with television films.

Nominees and winners

1980s

1990s

2000s

2010s

2020s

See also

 Canadian television awards

References

TV movie